Loewia tanaensis is a subshrub with yellow/orange flowers. It is native to the dry tropics of Kenya. It is believed to be distylous.

References 

Passifloraceae
Taxa named by Ignatz Urban